The 2013–14 San Francisco Dons women's basketball team represented the University of San Francisco in the 2013–14 college basketball season. It was head coach Jennifer Azzi's fourth season at San Francisco. The Dons, were members of the West Coast Conference and played their home games at the War Memorial Gymnasium.

Roster

Schedule and results
Source:

|-
!colspan=12 style="background:#FFCC33; color:#006633;"| Exhibition Season

|-
!colspan=9 style="background:#006633; color:#FFCC33;"| Regular Season

|-
!colspan=9 style="background:#FFCC33; color:#006633;"| 2014 West Coast Conference women's basketball tournament

Game Summaries

Exhibition: Cal State Chico

Fordham
Series History: San Francisco leads series 2-1
Broadcasters: Dave Raymond & Julianne Viani

Columbia

Exhibition: Dominican

Long Beach State

San Jose State

UC Davis

Cal Poly

UNLV

Cal State Bakersfield

Boise State

UMKC

Fresno State

Santa Clara
Series History: Santa Clara leads 52-35

Loyola Marymount
Series History: Loyola Marymount leads 33-31

Pepperdine
Series History: Pepperdine leads 34-33
Broadcaster: Josh Perigo

Pacific
Series History: San Francisco leads 15-12

Saint Mary's
Series History: Saint Mary's leads 34-23

Gonzaga
Series History: Gonzaga leads 31-24

Portland
Series History: Portland leads 30-26

BYU
Series History: BYU leads series 8-2
Broadcasters: Spencer Linton, Kristen Kozlowski, and Andy Boyce

San Diego
Series History: San Diego leads 35-24

Portland
Series History: Portland leads 31-26

Gonzaga
Series History: Gonzaga leads 32-24

San Diego
Series History: San Diego leads 36-24

BYU
Series History: BYU leads 9-2
Broadcaster: Joe Castellano

Santa Clara
Series History: Santa Clara leads 53-35

Saint Mary's
Series History: Saint Mary's leads 35-23

Pacific
Series History: San Francisco leads 15-13
Broadcaster: Don Gubbins

Pepperdine
Series History: Series even 34-34

Rankings

See also
San Francisco Dons women's basketball

References

San Francisco Dons women's basketball seasons
San Francisco
San Francisco Dons
San Francisco Dons